Sam Hill House may refer to:

Sam Hill House (Seattle), in Seattle, Washington, U.S.
Sam Hill House (Marshall, Michigan), listed on the Michigan State historic registry in Calhoun County
 Samuel E. Hill House, in Hartford, Kentucky, U.S., listed on the National Register of Historic Places